Nico Martinez is a litigator at Bartlit Beck LLP.

Early life and education

Martinez earned his Bachelor of Arts degree with honors in Political Science from Stanford University in 2007 and his Juris Doctor from Stanford Law School, where he was a senior editor of the Stanford Law Review in 2013.

Career

Martinez was a Legislative Correspondent for United States Senator Harry Reid (2007–2008). Martinez served as a law clerk for John T. Noonan, Jr. of the United States Court of Appeals for the Ninth Circuit (2013–2014), Lucy Koh of the United States District Court for the Northern District of California (2014–2015) and Mariano-Florentino Cuéllar of the Supreme Court of California (2015–2016). Martinez is an adjunct professor of Law and co-director of the Federal Appellate Clinic at Northwestern University Pritzker School of Law. Martinez joined Bartlit Beck LLP in September 2016 and became partner in January 2020.

Notable cases 

In 2017 - 2018, Martinez defended PwC against Colonial Bank and the FDIC in a suit filed after the collapse of PwC's audit client Colonial Bank. Colonial Bank sought several hundred million dollars in damages.

In 2022, Martinez was co-lead trial counsel for plaintiffs in Rose et al. v. Raffensperger. The case was a voting rights lawsuit that successfully challenged the at-large, statewide method of electing members of Georgia's Public Service Commission, the entity that regulates utility services in the State.

In 2022, Martinez was lead counsel for several major institutional investors who collectively lost billions of dollars when the Structured Alpha hedge funds managed by Allianz Global Investors United States collapsed in 2020.

Personal life 

Martinez is multilingual, speaking English, Spanish, Portuguese and French.

Recognition 

Benchmark Litigation's "40 & Under Hotlist" (2021-2022)

Lawdragon 500 Leading Litigators in America 2022

Selected publications
 Pulling the Plug on the Virtual Jury: Why Khalid Sheikh Mohammed Should Not Be Tried at Guantanamo by Jurors Sitting in New York City (2012)
 Pinching the President’s Prosecutorial Prerogative: Can Congress Use Its Purse Power to Block Khalid Sheikh Mohammed’s Transfer to the United States? (2012)

References

Living people
Year of birth missing (living people)
Stanford Law School alumni
Stanford University School of Humanities and Sciences alumni